Thomas Fitzgibbon Moore was a constable and politician in Newfoundland. He represented Trinity Bay in the Newfoundland House of Assembly.

Moore arrived in the New Harbour area on Trinity Bay from Ireland or France in the early 1800s. Apparently, he was originally known as Thomas Fitzgibbon. He became a constable at Dildo by 1822. Moore was elected to the Newfoundland assembly in 1837.

References 

Members of the Newfoundland and Labrador House of Assembly
Newfoundland Colony people
Year of birth uncertain
Year of death uncertain
Canadian police officers
Immigrants to pre-Confederation Newfoundland